Soganaclia is a genus of moths in the subfamily Arctiinae. The genus was erected by Paul Griveaud in 1964.

The species of this genus are found in northern Madagascar where they seem to be confined to the high altitudes of the Tsaratanana Massif.

Species
Soganaclia roedereri Griveaud, 1970
Soganaclia tsaratananae Griveaud, 1970
Soganaclia viridisparsa Griveaud, 1964

References

Arctiinae